Millotauropus is a genus of pauropods, comprising the monotypic family Millotauropodidae in the monotypic order Hexamerocerata. Eight species are known. Species of Hexamerocerata are characterized by a 12-segmented body, a 6-segmented antenna, and have at most 11 pairs of walking legs as adults. Additionally, Hexamerocerata possess tracheae on the bases of first pair of legs, features lacking in all other pauropods (those comprising the larger order Tetramerocerata). The body is colored white, and individuals are usually larger than in Tetramerocerata. Hexamerocerata are found in the tropics of Brazil, continental Africa, Madagascar, and Seychelles, as well as Japan.

References

External links

Myriapod genera
Monotypic arthropod genera